Sir Philip Cary (died 1437) of Cockington, Devon, was Member of Parliament for Devon in 1433.

Origins
He was the son and heir of Sir Robert Cary (died c. 1431) of Cockington, Devon, 12 times Member of Parliament for Devon, by his first wife  Margaret Courtenay, a daughter of Sir Philip Courtenay (1340–1406), of Powderham, Devon, 4th (or 5th or 6th) son of Hugh Courtenay, 2nd Earl of Devon (1303–1377) by his wife Margaret de Bohun (died 1391), daughter and heiress of Humphrey de Bohun, 4th Earl of Hereford (1298–1322) by his wife Elizabeth Plantagenet, a daughter of King Edward I.

Marriages and progeny

He married Christiana de Orchard (died 1472), daughter and heiress of William de Orchard of Orchard (later Orchard Portman), near Taunton in Somerset. She survived him and remarried to Walter Portman, 10 times MP for Taunton, by whom she had issue, ancestors of the present Viscount Portman, owner of the Portman Estate in London. By Christiana de Portman he had issue:
Sir William Cary (1437–1471), of Cockington, son and heir.

Death
He died on Sunday, the Feast of St Tecla the Virgin, 1437.

Further reading
History of Parliament biography of Philip Cary (not available on-line)

Sources
Roskell, J.S., &  Woodger, L.S., biography of Cary, Robert (d.c.1431), of Cockington, Devon, published in History of Parliament: House of Commons 1386-1421, ed. J.S. Roskell, L. Clark, C. Rawcliffe., 1993
Roskell, John Smith, The Commons in the Parliament of 1422, pp. 161–2, Robert Cary
Prince, John, (1643–1723) The Worthies of Devon, 1810 edition, London, pp. 176–179, biography of Cary, Sir John, Knight

References

1437 deaths
Philip
English MPs 1433
Members of the Parliament of England (pre-1707) for Devon